Fengxi may refer to the following places in China:

 Fengxi District (枫溪管理区), a specified area in Chao'an District, Chaozhou, Guangdong, which is directly administrated by the Chaozhou government
 Fengxi Town, Guangdong (枫溪镇), a town in Chao'an District
 Fengxi, Hubei (丰溪镇), a town in Zhuxi County, Hubei
 Fengxi Township, Mingxi County (枫溪乡), a township in Mingxi County, Fujian
 Fengxi Township, Pucheng County (枫溪乡), a township in Pucheng County, Fujian
 Fengxi Subdistrict, Zhuzhou (枫溪街道), a subdistrict of Lusong District in Zhuzhou, Hunan
 Fengxi Subdistrict, Shangrao (丰溪街道), a subdistrict of Guangfeng District in Shangrao, Jiangxi

See also
Feng Xi (died 222), general of Shu Han